A special election was held in  was held on October 9, 1798 to fill a vacancy left by the resignation of Samuel Sitgreaves (F), who'd been appointed commissioner to Great Britain under the Jay Treaty.  The election was held on the same day as elections to the 6th Congress.

Election results

See also 
List of special elections to the United States House of Representatives
 United States House of Representatives elections, 1798 and 1799

References 

Pennsylvania 1798 04
Pennsylvania 1798 04
1798 04
Pennsylvania 04
United States House of Representatives 04
United States House of Representatives 1798 04